Angélique is a 1927 French opera by Jacques Ibert to a libretto by "Nino", a pseudonym of Michel Veber, Ibert's brother-in-law. A 1996 recording conducted by Yoram David was released on Fonit.

References

Operas